Nebria fageticola is a species of ground beetle in the Nebriinae subfamily that is endemic to Greece.

References

fageticola
Beetles described in 2009
Beetles of Europe
Endemic fauna of Greece